The Gorinchemse Voetbalvereniging Unitas is a Dutch association football club from Gorinchem. It is among the oldest football clubs of the Netherlands and for most of the 20th century played in the highest leagues of amateur football. In 2018 the first team of GVV Unitas returned to the Hoofdklasse. They won promotion to the Derde Divisie in 2020.

History
GVV Unitas was founded on 19 April 1898. It joined the main KNVB leagues in 2007, initially as a Derde Klasse team. In 2011 Unitas promoted to the Tweede Klasse. In 1924 it won a Tweede Klasse championship, promoting to the Eerste Klasse, at that time the highest league of Dutch football. In 1926 Unitas relegated to the Tweede Klasse. It won Tweede Klasse championships in 1928, 1944, and 1946 but did not promote to the costly leading league.

In 1956 Unitas promoted for a second time to the Eerste Klasse, after winning its fifth Tweede Klasse championship, and after a league above the Eerste Klasse had been established. In 1963 and 1967 it became champion of the Eerste Klasse without promoting. In 1970 Unitas relegated to the Tweede Klasse, immediately returning to the Eerste with a sixth Tweede Klasse championship.

In 1998 the club celebrated 100 years with several events. Coen Moulijn suffered a heart attack at the event he attended.

Since 2018 Unitas is back the Hoofdklasse, after taking a championship in the Eerste Klasse. It finished the first Hoofdklasse season in decades in 5th position. Last game of the first Saturday squad of the 2018–2019 season ended in a 7–0 loss to SV Meerkerk.

Current squad

Players who became internationals
 Jan Peters
 Robert Verbeek
 Hans Vonk
 Frank Wels

References

Association football clubs established in 1898
1898 establishments in the Netherlands
Football clubs in the Netherlands
Football clubs in South Holland
Sports clubs in Gorinchem